<mapframe
text="Sagtikos Manor, on Long Island"
width=280 	
height=250	
zoom=12
latitude=40.702778
longitude=-73.276667 />
Sagtikos Manor is a historic home located at West Bay Shore in Suffolk County, New York.  It is a long, eclectic structure which has been extensively enlarged by additions and alterations during its long and active life as a residence.  The original section was built around 1697 and is a -story, timber-framed structure with a gable roof.  Additions occurred through the early 20th century.  Also on the property is a carriage house, caretaker's cottage, buttery, potting shed, formal gardens, and Thompson-Gardiner family cemetery.

The property was first patented to Stephanus Van Cortlandt (1643–1700), who built the original house.  During the 18th through 20th centuries, it was owned by the prominent Thompson and Gardiner families. The manor functioned for a time during the American Revolution as local headquarters for British forces under General Sir Henry Clinton. In 1790, George Washington recorded in his diary an overnight stop at "Squire Thompson's" during his tour of Long Island. It is operated by The Sagtikos Manor Historical Society and was added to the National Register of Historic Places in 1976.

Robert David Lion Gardiner inherited the property in 1930 and allowed the newly created Sagtikos Manor Historical Society to use the property in 1964.

In 2012 the Historical Society sued the Robert David Lion Gardiner Foundation. They argued that Gardiner had intended that part of his estate should go to support the maintenance of the property.  However, since his will did not specifically name the Society, the courts ruled the Society did not have standing, could not even request an audit of the Foundation's finances.  The Society had been looking for $65,000 per year.

References

External links
Sagtikos Manor Official Website
Sagtikos Manor (Suffolk County Department of Parks)
Sagtikos Manor - West Bay Shore (Historic Long Island, New York)

Houses on the National Register of Historic Places in New York (state)
Colonial Revival architecture in New York (state)
Historic house museums in New York (state)
Houses completed in 1697
Houses in Suffolk County, New York
Museums in Suffolk County, New York
Historical society museums in New York (state)
National Register of Historic Places in Suffolk County, New York
1697 establishments in the Province of New York